Carlo Raffaele Trezzi (born 31 May 1982 in Milan) is a former Italian football player who played as a midfielder.

Football career
Trezzi started his career at Internazionale. He made his debut against Bologna on 17 June 2001.

While he was too old for the youth team (Under-20), he was loaned to Serie C1 side Avellino, and then transferred to Pro Patria on loan and later became a co-ownership deal in 2004, for €125,000. During the July 2008 he was transferred to Foggia.

References

External links

Italian footballers
Inter Milan players
U.S. Avellino 1912 players
Aurora Pro Patria 1919 players
Calcio Foggia 1920 players
S.C. Caronnese S.S.D. players
A.C. Perugia Calcio players
Serie A players
Serie C players
Association football midfielders
Footballers from Milan
1982 births
Living people